"Bones" is a song by Swedish electronic music duo Galantis featuring vocals from American pop rock band OneRepublic, released on 31 January 2019 via Atlantic Recording in the United States and WEA International elsewhere around the globe. It was written by Bloodshy, Ryan Tedder, David Brook, Brett McLaughlin, Danny Majic, DJ Frank E, and Andy Grammer with production handled by Galantis, Bloodshy, Ryan Tedder, Danny Majic and DJ Frank E.

Track listing 
Digital download
 "Bones" – 3:26

Digital download – Steff da Campo Remix
"Bones" (Steff da Campo Remix) – 2:47

Digital download – Hook N Sling Remix
"Bones" (Hook N Sling Remix) – 3:14

Digital download – B-Sights Remix Remix
"Bones" (B-Sights Remix Remix) – 2:55

Credits and personnel
Credits adapted from Tidal.
 Production – Christian "Bloodshy" Karlsson, Henrik Jonback, Danny Majic, Frank E
 All instruments – Christian "Bloodshy" Karlsson, Henrik Jonback, Danny Majic
 Arranger – Christian Karlsson, Henrik Jonback
 Featured artist – OneRepublic
 Main artist – Galantis
 Mastering – Cass Irvine
 Mixing – Galantis, Niklas Flyckt
 Vocals – Ryan Tedder
 Writer – Andy Grammer, Brett McLaughlin, Christian Karlsson, Danny Majic, David Brook, Henrik Jonbak, Jimmy Koitzsch, Justin Franks, Ryan Tedder

Charts

Weekly charts

Year-end charts

Certifications

Release history

References 

2019 songs
2019 singles
Atlantic Records singles
Warner Music Group singles
Galantis songs
OneRepublic songs
Songs written by Christian Karlsson (DJ)
Songs written by Henrik Jonback
Songs written by Ryan Tedder
Songs written by David Brook (songwriter)
Songs written by DJ Frank E
Songs written by Andy Grammer
Songs written by Style of Eye
Songs written by Svidden